The Battle of the Admin Box (sometimes referred to as the Battle of Ngakyedauk or the Battle of Sinzweya) took place on the southern front of the Burma campaign from 5 to 23 February 1944, in the South-East Asian Theatre of World War II.

Japanese forces attempted a local counter-attack against an Allied offensive with the aim of drawing Allied reserves from the Central Front in Assam, where the Japanese were preparing their own major offensive. After initial setbacks, the Allies recovered to thwart the Japanese attack, pioneering the methods which would lead to further Allied victories over the following year.

The battle takes its name from the "administration area" of the Indian Army's 7th Division, which became a makeshift, rectangular defensive position for Major-General Frank Messervy and his staff after their divisional headquarters was overrun on 7 February.

Situation in early 1944
During 1941 and early 1942, the Japanese army had driven Allied troops (British, Indian and Chinese) from Burma. During 1943, the Allies had tried a limited offensive into Arakan, the coastal province of Burma. The aim had been to secure Akyab Island at the end of the Mayu Peninsula. The island possessed an important airfield, from which the Japanese Army Air Force had launched raids on Calcutta and other Indian cities, and which also featured prominently in Allied plans to recapture Burma.

This offensive had failed disastrously. Because the British Indian Army was being massively expanded, most of the Indian (and British) units committed to the attack lacked training and experience. Exhausted units were left in the front line, and their morale declined. Allied tactics and equipment were not suited to the jungle-covered hills, and Japanese units repeatedly achieved surprise by crossing rivers and hills which the Allies had dismissed as impassable. Finally, the Allied command structure was inefficient, with a single overworked division headquarters trying to control a large number of sub-units and also a large line-of-communications area.

During the following months, the Allies reorganised, engaged in extensive jungle training, and prepared for a renewed effort in 1944. Under the British Fourteenth Army, the offensive was to be launched by Indian XV Corps, commanded by Lieutenant General Philip Christison.

Second Allied offensive
The Mayu Peninsula consisted of a coastal plain, indented by several chaungs (tidal creeks), and separated from the fertile valley of the Kalapanzin River by the jungle-covered Mayu Range of hills. The 5th Indian Infantry Division, which had already experienced heavy fighting in East Africa and the North African Western Desert and was commanded by Major-General Harold Rawdon Briggs, attacked down the coastal plain. The well-trained 7th Indian Infantry Division under Major-General Frank Messervy attacked down the Kalapanzin Valley. The British 81st (West Africa) Division was advancing further east down the Kaladan River valley, but would not directly affect the battle. Two other divisions, the British 36th Infantry Division in Calcutta and 26th Indian Infantry Division at Chittagong, were in reserve.

The advance began cautiously at first, but steadily gained momentum. On 9 January 1944, 5th Indian Division captured the small port of Maungdaw. While they reduced Japanese positions south of the port (the village of Razabil and a hill known from its shape as the Tortoise), the Corps prepared to take the next major objective. This was part of the Mayu Range where two disused railway tunnels provided a route through the hills linking Maungdaw to the towns of Buthidaung and Letwedet in the Kalapanzin Valley. To reposition troops and resources for this attack, the engineers of the 7th Indian Division improved a narrow track, known as the Ngakyedauk Pass, across the hills, while a large administration area, later to be known as the "Admin Box" was established at Sinzweya, near the eastern end of the pass.

Japanese moves
The Japanese Twenty-Eighth Army, commanded by Lieutenant General Shōzō Sakurai, defended Arakan and southern Burma. Its 55th Division under Lieutenant General Tadashi Hanaya occupied Arakan. Most of the division's troops (five battalions) were grouped as Sakurai Force in the Mayu area, under its Infantry Group headquarters commanded by Major-General Tokutaro Sakurai, no relation to the Army commander. (A Japanese division had a separate headquarters to administer its infantry units which, as in this case, could take tactical control of any substantial detachment from the division.)

The Japanese were confident that they could repeat their success of the previous year in a local counter-attack, and perhaps even advance on Chittagong, the port on which Indian XV Corps relied for supplies. Also, it was intended that by launching their attack (given the name HA-GO or Operation Z) in the first week of February, they would force the Allies to send reinforcements to Arakan from the Central Front, thus clearing the way for the main Japanese offensive there, planned to begin in the first week of March.

Beginning on 5 February, Sakurai Force infiltrated the front lines of the 7th Indian Division, which was widely dispersed, and moved north undetected on the small town of Taung Bazaar. Here they crossed the Kalapanzin River and swung west and south, and on 6 February they attacked the HQ of 7th Division. There was heavy fighting, but 7th Division's signallers and clerks eventually had to destroy their documents and equipment and split up into small parties and retreat to the Admin Box. (Other radio operators listening on the division's frequency heard a voice say, "Put a pick through that radio", then silence.)

Sakurai's force then followed up towards Sinzweya and the rear of 7th Division. A Japanese battalion (I/213 Regiment, known as Kubo Force from its commander), crossed the Mayu Range at a seemingly impossible place, to set ambushes on the coastal road by which the 5th Indian Division was supplied. The Japanese still holding Razabil and the railway tunnels area (Doi Force) launched a subsidiary attack to link up with Sakurai, and made smaller raids and diversions, while unexpectedly large numbers of Japanese fighter aircraft flew from Akyab to contest the skies over the battlefield.

Battle
It was evident to all of XV Corps that the situation was serious. However, the Fourteenth Army had spent much time considering counters to the standard Japanese tactics of infiltration and encirclement. The forward divisions of XV Corps were ordered to dig in and hold their positions rather than retreat, while the reserve divisions advanced to their relief.

The next obvious objective for the Japanese was the administrative area at Sinzweya, defended by headquarters and line of communication troops, with 25 Light AA / Anti Tank Regiment, RA. As Messervy was in the jungle and out of contact, Christison, the Corps commander, ordered Brigadier Geoffrey Evans, who had recently been appointed commander of 9th Indian Infantry Brigade, part of the 5th Indian Division, to make his way to the Admin box, assume command and hold the Box against all attacks. Evans reinforced the defenders of the box with 2nd Battalion, the West Yorkshire Regiment) from his own brigade, and 24 Mountain Artillery Regiment IA. The most vital reinforcements of all were two squadrons of M3 Lee tanks of the 25th Dragoons. The defenders were later joined by part of the 4th Battalion of the 8th Gurkha Rifles (from the 89th Indian Infantry Brigade, part of 7th Indian Division) and also the artillery of 8 (Belfast) HAA Regiment Royal Artillery and 6 Medium Regiment RA.

Under Evans, the Box was converted into a defended area. The clearing measured a bare  in diameter. When Major-General Messervy reached the Admin Box, followed by several of his HQ personnel who had made their way in small parties through Japanese forces, he left the defence of the Box to Evans while he himself concentrated on re-establishing control over and directing the rest of the division.

Meanwhile, Allied Dakota transport aircraft dropped rations and ammunition to the cut-off troops, including the defenders of the Admin Box. They flew a total of 714 sorties, dropping 2,300 tons of supplies. The Japanese had not foreseen this development. While they ran short of supplies, the Indian formations could fight on. The Japanese tried to supply Sakurai Force with a convoy of pack mules and Arakanese porters, following the route of Sakurai's original infiltration but this was ambushed and the supplies were captured.

The first air-drop missions met opposition from Japanese fighters and some transport aircraft were forced to turn back but three squadrons of Spitfires, operating from new airfields around Chittagong, gained air superiority over the battlefield. Sixty-five Japanese aircraft were claimed shot down or damaged for the loss of three Spitfires (though the Japanese fighters also shot down several Hawker Hurricane fighter-bombers and other aircraft.) Whatever the true figures, the Japanese fighters were quickly driven from the area.

On the ground, the fighting for the Admin Box was severe and for the most part hand to hand. On the night of 7 February, some Japanese troops captured the divisional Main Dressing Station. In what was undoubtedly a war crime, thirty-five medical staff and patients were murdered. This may have increased the resolve of the defenders who were now aware what fate would befall them if they surrendered. Japanese fire caused heavy casualties in the crowded defences and twice set ammunition dumps on fire. All attempts to overrun the defenders were thwarted by the tanks, to which the Japanese had no counter once their few mountain guns were out of ammunition. The Japanese tried an all-out attack on the night of 14 February and succeeded in capturing one hill on the perimeter. The 2nd West Yorkshire with support from the tanks recaptured it the next day, although they suffered heavy casualties.

By 22 February, the Japanese had been starving for several days. Colonel Tanahashi, commanding the Japanese 112th Infantry Regiment, which provided the main body of Sakurai's force, stated that his regiment was reduced to 400 men out of an original strength of 2,150 and refused to make further attacks. On 24 February (19 February by other sources), he broke radio communications and retreated without authorisation. On 26 February, Sakurai was forced to break off the operation. The 26th Indian Division had relieved 5th Division, which sent a brigade to break through the Ngakyedauk Pass to relieve 7th Division. Kubo force was cut off and suffered heavy casualties trying to return to Japanese lines.

Aftermath

Although total Allied casualties were higher than the Japanese, the Japanese had been forced to abandon many of their wounded to die. Five thousand Japanese dead were counted on the battlefield. For the first time in the Burma campaign, the Japanese tactics had been countered and indeed turned against them. This was to be repeated on a far larger scale in the impending Battle of Imphal. In terms of morale also, the fact that British and Indian soldiers had held and defeated a major Japanese attack for the first time was widely broadcast.

The value of Allied air power had been demonstrated, and was to be a vital factor in the overall Allied victory in the Burma campaign. At the Japanese surrender meetings in Rangoon on 11 September 1945, Major General Ichida read a statement which identified two unforeseen and vital factors which had put the Japanese at a "disastrous disadvantage":

(a) Allied air supply, which permitted ground forces in Burma to consolidate their positions without being forced to retreat and thus rendered the enemy's infiltration and encircling tactics abortive.
(b) Allied air superiority, which so disrupted Japanese supply lines, both in Burma and further afield, that starvation and illness overtook thousands of Japanese troops facing Fourteenth Army and also denied them the essential supplies of fuel, equipment and material with which to fight a better equipped and supplied, Allied Force.

In the second week of March, the 161st Indian Infantry Brigade (part of the 5th Division) finally captured the "Tortoise" and the other fortifications around Razabil by a flanking manoeuvre, before the division was withdrawn into reserve. The 26th Indian and 36th British Divisions resumed the offensive in late March and early April. The 36th Division captured the railway tunnels by 4 April. On 6 April, troops from the 26th Division captured a vital hill, named Point 551, which dominated the area and where the Japanese had won an important victory just under a year earlier.

At this point, XV Corps' operations were curtailed to free transport aircraft and troops for the Imphal battle. As the monsoon began, it was found that the low-lying area around Buthidaung was malarial and unhealthy and the Allies actually withdrew from the area to spare themselves losses to disease. The Japanese had moved the 54th Division to Arakan, and concentrated a force of four battalions under Colonel Koba of the 111th Infantry Regiment against the 81st West African Division in the Kaladan Valley. With support from a unit of the Indian National Army and local Arakanese, this force mounted a successful counter-attack against the isolated West African division, forcing it to retreat and eventually withdraw from the valley.

Akyab remained in Japanese hands until January 1945, when a renewed Allied advance combined with amphibious landings drove the Japanese from Arakan, inflicting heavy casualties by landing troops to cut off their retreat down the coast.

Indian National Army contribution
The lightly armed 1st battalion of the Indian National Army's 1st Guerrilla Regiment had been directed to participate in the Japanese diversionary attack. They left Rangoon in early February, but by the time they reached Akyab in early March, the Japanese offensive was nearing its end. The battalion subsequently marched up the Kaladan river and progressed slowly but successfully against Commonwealth African units before crossing the Burma-India border to occupy Mowdok, near Chittagong.

Holland notes the presence of INA troops around the dressing station and their apparent participation in the attack and subsequent massacre – this based on the testimony of an Indian Army doctor captured during the attack and earmarked for conscription into the INA by the Japanese.

Awards for valour
Major Charles Ferguson Hoey of the 1st Battalion, The Lincolnshire Regiment was posthumously awarded the Victoria Cross, for conspicuous valour during the fighting at the Ngakyedauk Pass.

Lieutenant Edward Otho Briggs of the Royal Engineers was posthumously awarded the Military Cross for gallantry in the construction of a chaung (stream) crossing for tanks of the 25th Dragoons.

Lieutenant John Dyson Kaye of the Lancashire Fusiliers posted Fourth battalion the Queen's Own Royal West Kent Regiment, was awarded the Military Cross for gallantry in defending his position in the West Tunnel area on 18 and 21 March 1944 Citation (JPG).

Sepoy Karam Singh was also awarded the Military Medal. He would later win the Param Vir Chakra.

L/Bdr. H. Mills and Sgt. W. M. Adrain of the 8 (Belfast) HAA Regiment Royal Artillery were awarded the Military Medal, and Lt. H.G. Bing, also of the 8 (Belfast) HAA Regiment Royal Artillery, the Military Cross.

Notes

References
 
 
 
 
 
 
 
 
 Maj-Gen S. Woodburn Kirby, History of the Second World War, United Kingdom Military Series: The War Against Japan Vol III, The Decisive Battles, London: HM Stationery Office, 1961/Uckfield: Naval & Military, 2004, .

World War II operations and battles of the Southeast Asia Theatre
Military history of Burma during World War II
Indian National Army
1944 in Burma
Admin Box
February 1944 events